Faror / Farvar Island is an island of Hormozgan Province in Iran. It is located 36 miles from the city of Abu Moussa and 141 miles from Bandar Abbas. The island is currently uninhabited save from a few government officials that reside there. Greater Farvar Island is situated in one of the world's earthquake belts. The remains of ruined buildings and water wells on the island testify to the presence of some settlements in the past. The island also contains a vast deposit of iron which is estimated to be at approximately 15,000 tons.

Farvar Island is 14.5 km by 7.5 in size, 26.20 km2 in area, and reaches a height of 476 meters or 1,562 feet.

Administratively, Farvar and Little Farvar are part of the Central District of Abumusa County.

Wildlife 
Faror Island is considered to be one of the richest wildlife regions in the country. A great number of wild birds like eagles, parrots, white-eared bulbul, hoopoe, bee-eaters, laughing dove, and yellow wagtails inhabit the island. The Iranian government established the Faror Protected Area in the island. Visitors can enjoy bird watching in the area.

Little Faror Island 
Little Faror Island, area 0.8 km2, is located 15.8 km south-southwest of Faror Island.

See also 
 List of lighthouses in Iran

References

External links 
 Faror Protected Area

Landforms of Hormozgan Province
Islands of Iran
Protected areas of Iran
Lighthouses in Iran